Techqua Ikachi, Land – My Life is a feature documentary by Swiss/German director Anka Schmid, the Swiss artist Agnes Barmettler and the Hopi Native American James Danaqyumptewa from 1989.  The documentary shows the history and life of Native Americans of the Hopi tribe in Arizona, in particular their problems with the American government in their fight for sovereignty. It is being told from the perspective of the Hopi tribe.

Summary 
The documentary consists of current and historical shots alike and is being complemented by sketches and drawings of Swiss artist Agnes Barmettler. Explanatory commentary is being omitted deliberately, instead the shots are being strung together to a whole by the narration of eldest of Hótevilla, a village in Arizona. The eldest of the village pass on the history of their peoples, talking about the nonviolent resistance against the land expropriation at the beginning of the 20th century and about the American authorities’ paternalism, due to which the natives’ traditions and way of life are being suppressed. The images refer to the present day and put the narrative not only into the North American but the global context. The main theme of the film, the slow fading away of a whole culture, is of timeless importance.

Background 
About 1986/87 the then 70 year old Hopi Native American James Danaqyumptewa (alias Jimmy Kootshongsi, 1916-1996) invited the young film student Anka Schmid and the Swiss painter Agnes Barmettler to his Hopi-village in the United States in order for them to document the way of life, legends and traditions of the Hopi tribe. Schmid and Barmettler ended up staying for a whole year in the village of Hótevilla in Arizona.

Festivals and awards 
Techqua Ikachi was in the competition at Sundance Film Festival in Park City, Utah. It won the  Cultural Award of the canton Solothurn and the Blue Ribbon Award of the Chicago International Film Festival.

Further festivals 
 Dok Leipzig
 Cinéma du Réel Paris
 Dokfest Munich
 (former) Los Angeles Filmfest (now Los Angeles Asian Pacific Film Festival)
 Visions du Réel Nyon
 San Francisco International Film Festival
 Festival dei Popoli Florence

Further information 
In 2006 Techqua Ikachi; Land – my Life / Land – mein Leben / Terre – ma vie was released in two versions (115 and 102 minutes) on DVD.

References

External links 
 Techqua Ikachi , Land – My Life on IMDB
 Techqua Ikachi , Land – My Life on Swiss Films 
 Techqua Ikachi, Land - My Life on www.artfilm.ch
 Techqua Ikachi , Land – My Life on the Newsletter TECHQUA IKACHI by James Danaqyumptewa
 Hopi Nation on www.indigenouspeople.net

Swiss independent films
1989 films
1989 documentary films
Swiss documentary films
Documentary films about Native Americans
Anthropology documentary films
Films about Native Americans
Documentary films about Arizona
Documentary films about indigenous rights
Documentary films about race and ethnicity in the United States
Documentary films about spirituality
Hopi culture